The first USS Albacore (SP-751) was a United States Navy patrol vessel in commission from 1917 to 1919.

Albacore was built as a civilian motorboat of the same name in 1900 by Howard Brothers at San Diego, California. The U.S. Navy acquired her from her owner, Bryant H. Howard of San Diego, in 1917 for World War I service as a patrol vessel. Ordered to be delivered to the Navy on 21 June 1917, she was commissioned soon thereafter as USS Albacore (SP-751).

Assigned to the 12th Naval District, Albacore operated on section patrol duty off California for the rest of World War I. She is known to have alternated between patrol and guard ship duty at San Diego with the patrol boat  throughout the summer of 1917.

The Navy returned Albacore to her owner on 19 March 1919.

Notes

References
 for USS Albacore (SP-751)
 for USS Nomad (SP-1046)
Department of the Navy: Navy History and Heritage Command: Online Library of Selected Images: Civilian Ships: Albacore (American Motor Boat, 1900). Served as USS Albacore (SP-751) in 1917–1919
NavSource Online: Section Patrol Craft Photo Archive: Albacore (SP 751)

Patrol vessels of the United States Navy
World War I patrol vessels of the United States
Ships built in San Diego
1900 ships